Solnechny Urban Settlement is the name of several municipal formations in Russia.
Solnechny Urban Settlement, a municipal formation which the work settlement of Solnechny and the settlement of Khalgaso in Solnechny District of Khabarovsk Krai are incorporated as
Solnechny Urban Settlement, a municipal formation which the Settlement of Solnechny in Ust-Maysky District of the Sakha Republic is incorporated as

See also
Solnechny (disambiguation)
Solnechnoye, Saint Petersburg, a municipal settlement in the federal city of St. Petersburg

References

Notes

Sources

Registry of the Administrative-Territorial Divisions of the Sakha Republic.

